Gerald is an unincorporated community in Henry County, in the U.S. state of Ohio.

History
A post office was established at Gerald in 1898, and remained in operation until 1907. The community was named after Gerald Donnelly, the son of a railroad promoter.

References

Unincorporated communities in Henry County, Ohio
Unincorporated communities in Ohio